Artificial Intelligence II is a compilation album released via Warp on 30 May 1994. It is the eighth and final release in Warp's Artificial Intelligence series. It peaked at number 16 on the UK Compilation Chart.

Critical reception

John Bush of AllMusic gave the album 4 stars out of 5, stating that it is "a bit more sonically experimental" than Artificial Intelligence. Mark Richardson of Pitchfork gave the album a 6.8 out of 10, saying: "By 1994 there were a lot of people making 'electronic listening music' and this doesn't feel like a particularly special assemblage of what was out there."

Track listing

Note
 Tracks 11–14 are excluded from the single-disc CD edition; tracks 13–14 are excluded from the cassette and standard double-disc vinyl editions.

Charts

References

External links
 
 
 Artificial Intelligence II at Warp

1994 compilation albums
Warp (record label) compilation albums
Record label compilation albums
Electronic compilation albums
Intelligent dance music compilation albums